The Lima Art Museum (Museo de Arte de Lima) is an art museum in Lima, Peru. The museum is located in the Palacio de la Exposición. The museum was inaugurated in 1961. The collection includes ceramics and textiles. MALI is a private organization supported by admission fees, contributions from members, and private donations.

In 2015, the museum opened its renovated galleries on the second floor of the Exhibition Palace, showcasing some of the collection's most important items. These galleries survey almost 3,000 years of history, from pre-Columbian textiles and pottery, to mid-twentieth century painting. The museum's contemporary art collection, numbering more than 1,000 works, is still largely kept in storage pending the development of a new wing.

The museum has been involved in the development of new research on Peruvian art history, housing one of the most extensive art archives in the region. The MALI has an active program of temporary exhibitions throughout the year, covering local and international artists. Past exhibitions have included Gordon Matta Clark, Milagros de la Torre, Martin Creed, Gerhard Richter, Wolfgang Tilmans, Martin Chambi, Annie and Josef Albers, Francis Alÿs, Fernando Bryce, Marcel Odenbach, Jorge Eduardo Eielson, among others.

Selected collection highlights

History 
The MALI is housed in the 1872 World's Fair Exhibition Palace, located in the Exposition Park, at the entrance of Lima's historic center. Antonio Leonardi, an Italian architect living in Lima at the time, designed the Italianate façade that wraps the building's structure–a cast-iron system designed by Gustave Eiffel’s atelier between 1870 and 1871. Leonardi, together with journalist Manuel Atanasio Fuentes, also designed the park, located on the former site of the Guadalupe Gate (one of ten gates along the city wall, torn down during the modernization campaigns of Jose Balta's presidency in 1868). Besides the Exhibition Palace, the park eventually came to house numerous structures, including the Moorish and Byzantine pavilions (built in 1921 to commemorate Peru's centennial of independence).

Manuel Solari Swayne Library 
Manuel Solari Swayne Library and the Peruvian Art Archive, part of the MALI's documentation area, constitute the main art library in Peru.

ARCHI. Digital Archive of Peruvian Art 
ARCHI is a platform dedicated to document and share a range of art expressions, material culture and architecture of Peru, in the most complete and representative way, contributing to its preservation and accessibility. ARCHI includes free educational resources to complement the teaching learning process in the classroom.

References

External links
 Official website
 ARCHI
Lima Art Museum within Google Arts & Culture

Museums in Lima
Art museums and galleries in Peru
World's fair architecture in South America